Colasposoma instabile is a species of leaf beetle of Southeast Africa and the Democratic Republic of the Congo, described by the German entomologist Edgar von Harold in 1877.

References

instabile
Beetles of the Democratic Republic of the Congo
Taxa named by Edgar von Harold
Beetles described in 1877